The 2018–19 Kansas Jayhawks women's basketball team represented the University of Kansas in the 2018–19 NCAA Division I women's basketball season. The Jayhawks were led by fourth year head coach Brandon Schneider. They played their home games at Allen Fieldhouse in Lawrence, Kansas as members of the Big 12 Conference. They finished the season 13–18, 2–16 in Big 12 play, to finish in last place. They advanced in the quarterfinals of the Big 12 Tournament, where they lost to Iowa State.

Roster

Schedule and results 

|-
!colspan=12 style=| Exhibition

|-
!colspan=12 style=| Non-conference regular season

|-
!colspan=12 style=| Big 12 regular season

|-
!colspan=12 style=| Big 12 Tournament

x- All JTV games will air on Metro Sports, ESPN3 and local affiliates.

Rankings
2018–19 NCAA Division I women's basketball rankings

See also 
 2018–19 Kansas Jayhawks men's basketball team

References 

Kansas Jayhawks women's basketball seasons
Kansas
Kansas Jayhawks women's basketball
Kansas Jayhawks women's basketball